Bromelia chrysantha is a plant species in the genus Bromelia. This species is native to Venezuela, Colombia, and Trinidad & Tobago.

References

chrysantha
Flora of Venezuela
Flora of Colombia
Flora of Trinidad and Tobago
Plants described in 1797
Flora without expected TNC conservation status